Whiteday Creek is a stream in the U.S. state of West Virginia.

The name derives from an Indian tribal leader, Opekiska, whose name translated to English as "White Day".

See also
List of rivers of West Virginia

References

Rivers of Marion County, West Virginia
Rivers of Monongalia County, West Virginia
Rivers of Taylor County, West Virginia
Rivers of West Virginia